Circle of One is the third album by American vocalist, pianist, and songwriter Oleta Adams and was released in 1990. Circle of One was Adams' first album to receive wide distribution; her two earlier albums (an untitled album in 1982 and Going on Record in 1983) were self-financed and received only local distribution.

History
After a successful collaboration with Tears for Fears on their 1989 album The Seeds of Love, Adams was offered a record deal of her own with Tears for Fears then-label Fontana Records. Produced by Tears for Fears' Roland Orzabal with Dave Bascombe, the album was initially unsuccessful as were the first two singles "Rhythm of Life" and "Circle of One". However, Adams had a hit in early 1991 with the third single from the album, her cover of Brenda Russell's "Get Here," which peaked at #4 in the UK Singles Chart and #5 on the US Billboard Hot 100. The album, which had received considerable critical acclaim, was re-released with two additional tracks and peaked at #1 in the UK Albums Chart and made the Top 20 of the US Billboard 200. It was certified Gold in both the UK and the US and received two Grammy nominations.

An expanded double CD reissue was released in 2018 via Caroline International.

Track listing

Note: Tracks 9 and 10 were not on the original 1990 release.

2018 deluxe edition:
 "Don't Look Too Closely" (Adams) 4:27
 "I've Got to Sing My Song" (live at Santa Barbara)(B-Side of "Get Here") 4:31
 "Birdland" (B-Side of "Get Here")  3:17
 "Think Again" (B-Side of "Circle of One") (Adams)
 "Watch What Happens" (B-Side of "Circle of One") 4:21
 "Don't Let the Sun Go Down on Me" (Single Mix) 5:55
 "Rhythm of Life" (Rhythm & Prophet) 4:33
 "Don't Let the Sun Go Down on Me" (Edit) 3:40
 "Rhythm of Life" (Gospella) 4:19

CD 2:
 "Circle of One" (Full Cycle 12") 6:29
 "Circle of One" (Hot Mix 12") 4:18
 "Circle of One" (T Remix)  6:00
 "Circle of One" (Yvonne's Circle Club Mix) 6:06
 "Rhythm of Life" (1991 remixes)
  "Rhythm of Life" (Full Mega) 8:05
 "Rhythm of Life" (Rhythm Dub) 5:40
 "Rhythm of Life" (Syncopated Urban Mix 7" Version) 4:07
 "Rhythm of Life" (Syncopated Urban Mix 12" Version) 5:08
 "Rhythm of Life" (1995 remixes)
  "Rhythm of Life" (Heavenly Edit) 5:21
 "Rhythm of Life" (Reverend Jefferson's Choo Choo Dub Mix) 6:35
 "Rhythm of Life" (Reverend Jefferson's Deeper Rhythm Mix) 9:22
 "Rhythm of Life" (Jules & Skin's Rhythm Mix) 7:17

Personnel
 Oleta Adams – vocals, keyboards
 John Cushon, Luís Jardim, Carol Steele – drums, percussion
 Pino Palladino – bass guitar
 Roland Orzabal – guitar, keyboards 
 Neil Taylor – guitar
 Dave Bascombe, Simon Clark – keyboards
 Matthew Vaughan – programming
 Adele Bertel, Andy Caine, Carol Kenyon, Tessa Niles, Biti Strauchn, Ian Wilson – backing vocals
 Phil Todd – brass, saxophone
 Will Gregory – saxophone
 Guy Barker, Chris White – brass
 Anne Dudley – string and brass arrangements

Charts

Weekly charts

Year-end charts

References

1990 albums
Oleta Adams albums
Fontana Records albums